Indivisible is an action role-playing platform game developed by the now-defunct Lab Zero Games and published by 505 Games. The game was initially released in October 2019 for Linux, macOS, Windows, PlayStation 4, and Xbox One and on April 28, 2020 for Nintendo Switch. It was released in Japan on July 16, 2020. A version for Amazon Luna was released on October 20, 2020.

Gameplay

Indivisible features platform-style action RPG exploration and combat mechanics inspired by Valkyrie Profile. The game focuses on two styles of gameplay. When in the overworld, the game will be played as an 2D action platformer with the player being able to move left and right as well as jump upon starting. Later on in the game, the player will learn new abilities and moves to progress further and faster. When touching an enemy in the overworld, the game will seamlessly transition to an action rpg and each character becomes controlled with a certain button. Pressing a button will move the character to the enemy to attack it. The buttons can be pressed in different orders and can be changed to different attacks by holding either up or down on the analog stick or D-pad. The player can obtain upgrades to allow them to attack multiple times with certain character. The player can also block when the enemy attacks using the attack button for the character they want to block with, or with the entire party. When engaged in a battle, a meter will fill in the corner of the screen. When the meter is full, the player can unleash a super attack using one of their characters.

Plot
The game begins with a battle between a group of warriors led by Indr (voiced by Keith Silverstein) and the goddess Kala (voiced by Anjali Bhimani). The battle ends with Kala being defeated and sealed on Mount Sumeru while Indr finds an abandoned baby they call Ajna (voiced by Tania Gunadi) and raises her as his own daughter.

16 years later, Ajna lives with her father in the village of Ashwat until it comes under attack by an army led by Dhar (voiced by Benjamin Diskin), who kills her father. After defeating Dhar, Ajna unexpectedly awakens a power in her that absorbs him into her mind, and so she forces him to take her to his leader, the warlord Ravannavar (voiced by Michael Dorn) who ordered the attack. While gaining more companions, Ajna eventually confronts and chases Ravannavar to Mount Sumeru where she kills him, unaware that Ravannavar's intention was to use her power to unseal Kala, as she is revealed to be part of her body, so that the goddess can destroy and recreate the world.

After being cast out of Sumeru, Ajna and her companions are rescued by the Deva Thorani (voiced by Zehra Fazal), who guides her to the nearby port, where she meets Angwu (voiced by Laura Patalano) a former member of Indr's party who instructs Ajna to look for several chakra gates around the world and activate them so that she can increase her power in preparation to face Kala in battle. After doing so, Ajna returns to Sumeru despite being warned by her friends that she might not be ready yet, and while facing Kala, she loses herself to anger, becoming a monster that causes massive destruction until a reformed Dhar sacrifices himself to stop her.

One week later, Ajna recovers and determined to atone for her mistakes, travels the world again to regroup with her friends, while helping to solve some problems she unwillingly caused during her previous journey, and returns to Sumeru for a final battle with Kala. In the occasion, Ajna bids farewell to her companions and convinces Kala to give up on destroying the world, the two merging together and disappearing.

In the post credits, an image of a merged Ajna and Kala is seen, living a new life.

Development
Indivisible was developed by Lab Zero Games, which consisted of members best known for the 2012 fighting game Skullgirls. Lab Zero Games  announced Indivisible during their Skullgirls panel at the Anime Expo on July 2, 2015. According to the developer, the game's storyline was influenced by southeast Asian mythology and other cultures. It also features 2D hand-drawn animation by Lab Zero Games' artists. Composer Hiroki Kikuta, best known for his work on Secret of Mana, scored the game's soundtrack.  The game features animation by Japanese anime studio Trigger and American animation studio Titmouse, Inc., with the opening animation directed by Yoh Yoshinari of Little Witch Academia.

A playable prototype of the game was released in tandem with the launch. If Lab Zero Games met or exceeded their goal, publisher 505 Games would contribute their remaining development budget. The campaign's initial 40-day contribution period faced relatively sluggish fundraising, earning approximately $764,000 by November 8, 2015. However, on November 13, 2015, the campaign was extended for an additional 20 days after the game received roughly 963,000 in pledges, above Indiegogo's required 60% threshold. Following the extension, the goal was eventually reached on December 2, 2015. The game was released on October 8, 2019 in North America and released three days later in Europe.

The game was eventually released on Nintendo Switch on April 28, 2020. However, this was done without any input from Lab Zero Games and was instead given a surprise release by a porting group. As a result, the game's launch was given no prior announcement and came as a surprise even to the original developers. Additionally, the Switch version was also launched missing features that were added through updates, such as co-operative play and New Game+ mode. This was due to the game accidentally launching on its original planned release date, rather than being delayed to early May 2020 as was intended.

On October 9, 2020, 505 Games announced the cancellation of all future updates and content for Indivisible following the dissolution of Lab Zero Games. However, despite no longer being updated, Indivisible is still available for purchase, and the final update for the Nintendo Switch version was released on October 13, 2020.

Animated series
On July 17, 2020, it was announced that an animated adaptation of Indivisible was in development for the Peacock streaming service, with Meg LeFauve and Jonathan Fernandez as writers and executive producers. The series was to be produced by DJ2 Entertainment and Legendary Television. The status of the series is currently unknown due to the closure of Lab Zero Games.

Reception

Indivisible received "generally favorable reviews" according to Metacritic.

Joe Juba of Game Informer praised the game's art style, animation, music and combat but criticized the backtracking and some other issues with the combat.

Accolades
The game was nominated for "Character Design" and "Game, Original Role Playing" at the NAVGTR Awards.

Notes

References

External links

2019 video games
505 Games games
Action role-playing video games
Crossover role-playing video games
Crowdfunded video games
Indie video games
Indiegogo projects
Linux games
Classic Mac OS games
Nintendo Switch games
Platform games
PlayStation 4 games
Single-player video games
Video games developed in the United States
Video games featuring female protagonists
Video games scored by Hiroki Kikuta
Windows games
Xbox One games
Television series by Universal Animation Studios